Nasarpur Railway Station is located in Nasarpur village, Peshawar district of Khyber Pakhtunkhwa province of the Pakistan.

See also
 List of railway stations in Pakistan
 Pakistan Railways

References

Railway stations in Peshawar District
Railway stations on Karachi–Peshawar Line (ML 1)